Ol Donyo Sabuk (in Maasai), or Kyanzavi in Kamba, is both a mountain and a town in Kyanzavi Division, Machakos County. William Northrup McMillan was the first white man to settle here, who had a major influence in the area.

Etymology 
The peak has a height  and was named by Maasai pastoralists, meaning big mountain. The Kamba name, Kyanzavi means the mountain of nzavi or Lablab beans (Lablab purpureus). Kilimambogo, (another name of the mountain) has two parts, Kilima – meaning a hill or mountain in Swahili, and mbogo meaning a buffalo in many Bantu languages. The forested part of the mountain has a large population of buffaloes. Buffalo is called Nyati in Swahili.

Location 
Driving on Garissa Road from Thika town, there are pineapple plantations on both sides, accentuated by little pockets of blooming eucalyptus. It will be a  drive from here to the famous Fourteen Falls, described as one of Kenya's most spectacular landmarks. By the river is St. Johns Kilimambogo Teachers College, and Immaculate Heart of Mary Mission hospital. Donyo Sabuk town is a kilometre (half-mile) away from Fourteen Falls, just across the Athi River, with a junction leading to the game park, and the other to the great house of Donyo Sabuk.

Down past the  mountain base sits Donyo Sabuk town, a town that has retained many things that Lord Macmillan bequeathed the area. Here, partying goes on well into the night, and there are a number of "boys' bands", where the box guitar is still in vogue. This musical town is the hometown of the late Kamba musician Kakai Kilonzo, late legendary Sila of Kilunda fame, and the still-active Gä'thika boys band.

Near the peak is the grave of Lord Macmillan, his wife and their dog. Also, there is an extra grave of one Louise, who started working for the Macmillan's when she was age 13 until her death.

In what was once one of the biggest ranches in Kenya, there are five towns inside the former Juja Ranch. The rural area is a multi-ethnic community in farms owned by people who were former squatters and his farm labourers. The mountain peak is inside a game park, and the rest is partially owned by the Kenyatta family.

Sir William Northrup McMillan
William Northrup McMillan was an American multi-millionaire and philanthropist who owned substantial farms in British East Africa. In 1905 he constructed the five bedroom Juja House on the property. Also constructed were a three bedroom manager's bungalow, a two bedroom bungalow called "Lucie's bolthole," and three other bungalows housing the post and telegraph office, and rooms for chauffeurs and gardeners. The buildings were fitted with electricity and running water, and a sewage system. In later years, Juja Farm would become a popular location for film crews.

Ol Donyo Sabuk National Park

The name of this park established in 1967, Ol Donyo Sabuk, means large mountain in Maasai. Wildlife species that can be spotted here include buffalo, colobus monkeys, baboons, bushbuck, impala, duiker, and abundant birdlife.

The mountain is the highest peak in the park, covering . It is particularly attractive for hikers or families wanting some freedom and exercise, outside their vehicles. One approach to the park is via the Fourteen Falls on the Athi River. The park's attraction is its beauty and views of both Mount Kenya and Mount Kilimanjaro. It teems with game including baboon, colobus, bushbuck, impala, duiker and many birds. While the name "Ol Donyo Sabuk" is Maasai for 'large mountain', the word Sabuk was mistakenly thought by many writers to mean "buffalo" whereas in fact Maasai call buffalo Olosowan. Today, some 250 buffalos roam the slopes. Kikuyu traditionalists also call the mountain by Kea-Njahe, known as the 'Mountain of the Big Rain', one of Ngai's lesser homes.

The steep ascent requires a 4WD (4×4) vehicle. Near the summit lie the graves of Sir William Northrup McMillan (1872–1925) and his wife Lady Lucie.

Tom Mboya

It was here in 1930, that one of Kenya's most colourful politicians, Tom Mboya, was born and brought up, when his father worked in then sisal farm as a labourer. Though the setting is not in a valley, this circuit comprised a prime chip of the famed Happy Valley set. Tom Mboya attended Kilimambogo Primary School, a Catholic Missionary Sponsored institution, within the larger St. Johns Kilimambogo Teachers College.

Kilimambogo Region

This is a Nairobi metropolitan region, ranging from Kwa Mwaura and Munyu Mweu area, in Matungulu North Ward Machakos County to Gatuanyaga near Thika Town Kiambu County and back through Juja Farm to Koma.  Areas within the region have local names, Kyanzavi being the popular name for the Ukamba region.  The area is full of culture, with almost all Kenyan tribes and cultures represented.

Wanjiku Kagiri (Maendeleo)

It was in 1960, when she arrived in the ranch, from Kinyui. She had bundled up her few possessions, which included a then-coveted linen business, making a hallmark grand entry, and influencing what would turn Ol-Donyo into a famous trading centre. Given its existing large labour population, she saw enormous business opportunity that had characterised the town until the end of the 70s. Locals honoured her by naming the adjacent trading centre after her. But after the fall of Muka Mukuu farmer's cooperative, the area was dismayed. The Ol-Donyo Sabuk status is a direct portrayal of the locals' state of financial affairs. wanjiku was the owner of Masaku trust land including Tala, Kangundo, Kawethei, Kakuyuni and many others.  It was confirmed in succession cause No:  332 of 2008 in the high court of Kenya, in the same Kenya Gazette notice No: 1705 of 2007. She was also a prominent businesswoman in the world.

The McMillan Castle

Further east of Ol-Donyo, the building that was McMillan's home, a fort by any definition, sits in splendour. More than three-quarters of the house is under key and lock. A part of it houses the Muka Mukuu Farmer's Co-operative Society, Ltd. a farmer's cooperative.   The land around the home is currently used for the production of pineapples.

Covering a ground enough for three basketball pitches, the villagers have spent more than a century wondering why a couple that had no children put up such a huge dwelling place. So large is the building that Lord Macmillan and his wife would spend one year in one wing of the house, then migrate to the other in the second half of the year. The locals are yet to figure out how they can benefit from such an obvious tourist attraction site.

Club House (Kilavu)
The early notorieties of the ranch captured the imagination of many people during the First World War, when the castle served as a military hospital for British officers. The wild parties held in the castle, where the notorious colonial maverick Colonel Ewart Grogan reputedly led the wine-tossing and supervised wife-sharing orgies, only spiced the sideshows that attracted international media. Hence the castle was baptised "Kilavu" by the locals, meaning Club house in Kamba.

Fourteen Falls

The Fourteen Falls area is protected and equipped with a picnic site. It has historical and religious importance both to the residents and Asian immigrants. The Asians use the site for recreation and spiritual rites, disposing of cremated ash in the river in the belief that it will go all the way to India through the Indian Ocean, hence acting as a shrine. Others come for recreation, retaining the Happy Valley theme that was first introduced by Lord McMillan. Like Lord McMillan, the adjacent community, some of whom are descendants of the people the adventurer brought here, still farm the land. Fourteen Falls is located just a little bit away from Thika town. The falls are geographically situated at an altitude of approximately 1400 metres above sea level.

References

External links 
 Ol Donyo Sabuk at Google

Populated places in Eastern Province (Kenya)
Populated places in Central Province (Kenya)
Machakos County
Kiambu County
Mountains of Kenya
National parks of Kenya
Northern Acacia-Commiphora bushlands and thickets